Cue (formerly Greplin) was a website and app that pulled information from online accounts to present an overview of a user's day.

Company info
Cue operated by linking various user accounts belonging to a registered individual and running a query search for keywords within those applications or accounts. For example, someone may have wanted to use a single search feature to check their Facebook, LinkedIn and Twitter accounts without signing in and checking each one individually.

Cue acted as a desktop search, indexing online social networking accounts, and thereby creating a “Personal Cloud.” Cue offered a free version that allowed users to add a certain number of accounts, while a paid version allowed users the option to "unlock" other sources and get more index space.

In 2011, Cue raised $4 million in funding from venture capital firm Sequoia. Their premium services were $5 per month, which included 500 MB of extra storage space, and $15 per month for an additional 2 GB.

Shut down
In October 2013, Apple Inc. bought the company, with the price estimated between $35 to $45 million. Cue premium users were refunded.

See also
Locker

References

External links
 – official site

Search engine software
Defunct online companies of the United States
Companies based in San Francisco
Internet properties disestablished in 2013
Apple Inc. acquisitions
2013 mergers and acquisitions
Defunct software companies of the United States